

First-team squad
Squad at end of season

Left club during season

Matches

MLS regular season

Source: MLS

MLS Cup Playoffs
Quarterfinals

Semifinals

MLS Cup

U.S. Open Cup

FIFA Club World Championship
As winners of the 2000 CONCACAF Champions' Cup, Los Angeles Galaxy was one of the 12 teams that were invited to the 2001 FIFA Club World Championship, which would be hosted in Spain from 28 July to 12 August 2001. However, the tournament was cancelled, primarily due to the collapse of ISL, which was marketing partner of FIFA at the time.

References

LA Galaxy seasons
Los Angeles Galaxy
Los Angeles Galaxy
2001 Major League Soccer season
2001